Yale World Fellows is an international fellowship program at Yale University for rising global leaders.

World Fellows come from around the world and from diverse disciplines. They are selected through a competitive application process. Each year, the program selects 16 World Fellows to reside at Yale for the fall semester to study, share their knowledge, and expand their networks.

The World Fellows program is located in Horchow Hall, within the Jackson Institute for Global Affairs, on Hillhouse Avenue.

History
In November 2000, University President Rick Levin announced several internationalization initiatives, including the World Fellows program, in conjunction with the university's tercentenary. Journalist and White House aide Brooke Shearer was appointed its founding director, and Dan Esty its first program director. The program moved into Betts House, restored in 2001 to house new international initiatives. The first class of fellows was admitted in 2002.

Since 2015, Emma Sky has been Director of the Yale World Fellows. Sky oversaw the transition of the program to the Jackson Institute for Global Affairs, and in 2016 secured a $16 million contribution from the Starr Foundation and Maurice R. Greenberg.

As of 2020, the program has a network of over 300 World Fellows from 90 countries.

Program

World Fellows "receive individual and group coaching and skills development training." They can audit courses at the university. They give talks and participate on panels across the campus.

A key component of the program is the weekly "Good society" seminar where World Fellows present what they do professionally and how they contribute to building a better society. World Fellows also host a weekly salon to which they invite Yale faculty and other guests for off-the-record conversations.

Selection
Admission to the program is highly competitive. The program runs from mid-August to mid-December. Fellows are required to be in residence at Yale during the duration of the program.

Candidates for the program must be:

 a citizen of a country other than the United States;
 fluent in English;
 in their early mid-career, roughly 5–20 years into their professional careers, with demonstrated professional accomplishments

Notable fellows
Notable World Fellows include:

 Alexei Navalny, a Moscow-based lawyer and political opposition leader, named one of Time magazine's 2012 100 Most Influential People
 Tim Jarvis, Australian environmental scientist
 María Corina Machado, Venezuelan Congresswoman and opposition leader, named one of BBC's World's 100 Most Influential Women in 2018
 Gidon Bromberg, Israeli environmental activist, named one of Time's "Environmental Heroes of the Year" in 2008
 Aboubakr Jamaï, Moroccan journalist, co-founder of Le Journal Hebdomadaire
 Ma Jun, environmental activist, winner of the 2012 Goldman Environmental Prize
 Norbert Mao, 2011 presidential candidate for the Democratic Party of Uganda
 Mohamed Elfayoumy, Egyptian diplomat and consul of Egypt in Damascus from 2010 to 2012
 Rui Chenggang, Chinese news anchor
 Martín Lousteau, National Deputy and ex-Minister of Economy of Argentina. Actual ambassador of Argentina in United States.
 Belabbes Benkredda, Algerian-German social innovator, 2013 NDI Democracy Award recipient
 Marvin Rees, Mayor of Bristol, United Kingdom
 Muna AbuSulayman, Saudi businesswoman and activist
 Ahmad Al-Basheer, Iraqi comedian, journalist and director
 Sultan Sooud Al-Qassemi, Emirati commentator on Arab affairs and a prominent voice during the Arab Spring
 Tania Bruguera, Cuban installation and performance artist
 Nandita Das, Indian actor and director
 Katrin Eggenberger, Foreign Minister of Lichtenstein
 Paula Escobar, Chilean magazine editor, columnist, and journalist
 Julio Guzmán, Peruvian economist, politician, and leader of the Purple Party
 Sergey Lagodinsky, German lawyer and politician of the Alliance 90/The Greens
 Claudia López Hernández, Colombian politician
 Renzo Martens, Dutch artist
 Omar Mohammed, citizen journalist who created and maintained the news blog Mosul Eye during the occupation of Mosul by the Islamic State of Iraq and the Levant (ISIL)
 Babatunde Omilola, Nigerian diplomat, development economist, banker and United Nations official 
 Roz Savage, English ocean rower, environmental activist
 Andriy Shevchenko, Ukrainian journalist and politician
 Jake Sullivan, former National Security Advisor to the U.S. Vice President Joe Biden
 Jian Yi, Chinese filmmaker, digital media expert and food systems innovator
 Annemie Turtelboom, Belgian politician
 Svyatoslav Vakarchuk, Ukrainian politician, musician and public activist
 Carlos Vecchio, Venezuelan lawyer, politician and social activist
 Temur Iakobashvili, Georgian political scientist, diplomat, and politician

References

External links
 

Fellowships
Organizations established in 2002
Yale University
2002 establishments in Connecticut